The yellow tyrannulet (Capsiempis flaveola) is a very small passerine bird in the tyrant flycatcher family. It breeds from Nicaragua south to northeastern Argentina and southeastern Brazil. It is the only member of the genus Capsiempis, but its taxonomy is uncertain, and it has been allocated to at least three other genera in the past.

This species is found in thickets, forest and streamside edges, dense second growth, and bushy pastures or clearings.  The cup nest is made of plant fibre and grass blades, decorated outside with moss. It is placed 2–7 m high in a tree, shrub, or maize plant. The typical clutch is two white eggs, usually unmarked or with very light rufous speckles.

Description
The yellow tyrannulet is 10.5-11.4 cm long, weighs 8 g, and with its slender build and small bill resembles a tiny vireo or warbler. Its upperparts are olive-green and the underparts are bright yellow. The head has whitish or pale yellow supercilia. The wings and tail are dusky brown with weak yellow feather-edging, and there are two yellowish wing bars. Sexes are similar, but young birds are browner above and paler yellow below. The call is a soft  and the duetted song is a rhythmic . There is some geographical variation in both appearance and vocalisation.

Diet
Yellow tyrannulets are active birds, seen in pairs or family groups feeding on insects, spiders and small berries. The prey is gleaned from foliage or taken in short sallies.

References

Further reading

External links
Yellow tyrannulet photos on antpitta.com

yellow tyrannulet
Birds of Costa Rica
Birds of Panama
Birds of South America
yellow tyrannulet